Vaskjala Reservoir is located on Pirita river in Vaskjala Village, Rae Parish, Harju County, Estonia near Jüri.

The reservoir is part of the Tallinn water supply system and is connected to Lake Ülemiste via Vaskjala-Ülemiste canal.

History 
The construction of the reservoir took place in 1969 and 1970.

Vaskjala beach was built on the shores of the reservoir in 1999.

See also 
Soodla Reservoir
Raudoja Reservoir
Aavoja Reservoir
Kaunissaare Reservoir
Paunküla Reservoir
Lake Ülemiste
List of lakes of Estonia

References

Rae Parish
Reservoirs in Estonia
Lakes of Harju County